The Promotion Fund of Vietnamese Football Talent Football Academy, simply known as the PVF Football Academy, is a football academy based in Hưng Yên. By 2020, PVF has been recognized by the Asian Football Confederation (AFC) as a three-star academy under the AFC Elite Youth Scheme, becoming the first football academy in Southeast Asia to enjoy the status.

History
The Promotion Fund of Vietnamese Football Talent (PVF) was founded and contributed capital by 03 members of Vingroup Group: Thien Tam Fund (80% contribution); PVF Investment and Trading, JSC (10%) and Vinpearl One Member Limited Company (10%). The foundation was founded on the idea of the late Prime Minister Vo Van Kiet with the aim of forming a system of training young professional soccer players of international standards, contributing to building young generations of young players. the talent and ethics, culture for the country football.

On December 4, 2008, PVF officially launched and June 12, 2009 opened the first course with 50 students selected from all over the country at the age of birth in 1997–1998. Since its founding, PVF's teams have made great achievements in the national youth football tournaments. By the beginning of 2016, PVF has made seven enrollments nationwide and has 175 students from 11 to 18 years of age in eight gifted classes. In the V-League 2016, all 13 players of the first course were loaned to PVF for loan.

PVF Youth Training Center is located in Van Giang district, Hung Yen province, which is the youngest football training center in Southeast Asia.

Facilities
PVF football training center is invested by Vingroup Group to build the most modern facilities on the area of nearly 22ha. PVF is equipped with the world's first soccer-themed decorations such as the dream: the 360s studio set was developed by Portugal's Benfica Lab 1; PlayerTek - Player performance monitor; sports science and sports facilities with 1600m2 gym equipped with 66 specialized equipment; 02 extreme polar extremes, 01 foam processing material under water.

With stadium 3,600 web pages equipped with system technology and standard tournament equipment of the national tournament, is a set of systems of Vietnam including 06 stadiums 11v11 with grass field staff created. FIFA Quality Pro certification. The special, first at a field, standard roof panel 11v11 was built with a 12m high covering covering the entire area of more than 8,800 m2. Design and build the airport design from the best materials and equipment: drainage systems in Australia's Megaflo, the Hunter system in the United States, and plants that produce Greenfields products in the Netherlands.

PVF continues to lead the 8-storey dormitory system with a cafeteria, conference hall, library, movie theater, gym and sports tournaments.

Honours

National competitions
Youth tournaments
Vietnam National U19 Football Tournament
 Winners :        2015
 Runners-up :   2017
 Third place :  2016

Vietnam National U17 Football Tournament
 Winners :        2014, 2015, 2017
 Runners-up :   2013
 Third place :  2018, 2020

Vietnam National U15 Football Tournament
 Winners :        2012, 2013, 2017
 Runners-up :   2014, 2015

Vietnamese National U13 Football Tournament
 Winners :        2010, 2012
 Runners-up :   2011, 2018

Management

Sponsors

Graduated players

First year
On November 18, 2016, at the Thanh Long Sports Center, Vietnam Fund for Talent Development and Investment (Vingroup) officially granted certificates of completion of training courses to 8 excellent students. First and signed handed players for professional football clubs.

Second year
During the ceremony, 22 outstanding players of PVF were born in 1997, 1998, 1999, 2000 and were officially handed over to the six clubs in the V-League. including SHB Đà Nẵng and Sài Gòn F.C, XSKT Cần Thơ, Becamex Bình Dương; 03 first club: Đồng Tháp, Huế, Bình Phước to compete for the 2018 season.

Relations with clubs
In March 2016 PVF and Gamba Osaka (Japan) signed a comprehensive cooperation agreement in two years. Gamba Osaka team will take the coach to help PVF train players, as well as select a number of potential faces to bring to Japan for advanced training or competition for Gamba Osaka. In addition, each year, Gamba Osaka will invite PVF youth teams to Japan to compete in international competitions held by this club.

References

External links 

Vingroup
Football academies in Vietnam